Kevin Bergin (born 15 September 1936) is a former Australian rules footballer who played with Carlton and Collingwood in the Victorian Football League (VFL).

Notes

External links 

Kevin Bergin's profile at Blueseum

1936 births
Carlton Football Club players
Collingwood Football Club players
Living people
Australian rules footballers from Victoria (Australia)
Old Paradians Amateur Football Club players